AfroCubism is a Grammy-nominated album featuring musical collaborations between musicians from Mali and Cuba. It was released in 2010.

Concept and recording

The album was recorded for the World Circuit label by producer Nick Gold and engineer Jerry Boys at Sonoland Studios, Madrid, Spain in 2010.  Mixing and mastering was done at Livingston Studios, London & FB Music and Media, Fareham.

The idea behind AfroCubism was the original concept for the Buena Vista Social Club album of 1997 which featured many of the same Cuban musicians. This original concept however, was thwarted when the Cuban visas for the Malian musicians were delayed in the post and producer Nick Gold instead called on the services of Ry Cooder whom he had recorded with Ali Farka Touré for the 1994 World Circuit release, Talking Timbuktu.  The album captures the rhythmic and melodic patterns which are common to traditional West African and Afro-Cuban music. The musicians involved in AfroCubism already had successful careers through participation in the Buena Vista Social Club or as solo artists. The project has subsequently toured around the world as a successful live show.

Critical reception 

The album was praised by AllMusic reviewer James Allen, who described the album as "a true musical meeting of minds between the two cultures [Cuban and Malian]".

Track listing 

 Mali Cuba
 Al vaivén de mi carreta
 Karamo
 Djelimady Rumba
 La culebra
 Jarabi
 Eliades tumbao 27
 Dakan
 Nima diyala
 A la luna yo me voy
 Para los pinares se va Montoro
 Benséma
 Guantanamera

Personnel 

Cuban musicians

 Eliades Ochoa - guitar, vocals 
 José Ángel Martínez - double bass 
 Jorge Maturell - congas, bongos, cowbell 
 Onsel Odit - chorus, rhythm guitar 
 Eglis Ochoa - maracas, guiro, chorus

Malian musicians

 Toumani Diabaté - kora 
 Bassekou Kouyate - ngoni 
 Kassé Mady Diabaté - vocals 
 Djelimady Tounkara - guitars 
 Fode Lassana Diabaté (originally from Guinea) - balafon 
 Baba Sissoko - talking drum

See also 
Afro-Cuban All Stars
Buena Vista Social Club

References 

Albums by Cuban artists
World music albums by Malian artists
Son cubano albums
2010 albums